Bükkábrány is a village in Borsod-Abaúj-Zemplén county, Hungary. In its open cast coal mine palaeontologist  found sixteen preserved trunks of cypress trees, estimated to be eight million years old. See 8 million years old cypresses.

External links 
 Street map 
 Ancient forest report

Populated places in Borsod-Abaúj-Zemplén County